Pemmican (also pemican in older sources) is a mixture of tallow, dried meat, and sometimes dried berries. A calorie-rich food, it can be used as a key component in prepared meals or eaten raw. Historically, it was an important part of indigenous cuisine in certain parts of North America and it is still prepared today. The word comes from the Cree word , which is derived from the word , "fat, grease". It was invented by the Indigenous peoples of North America.

Pemmican was widely adopted as a high-energy food by Europeans involved in the fur trade and later by Arctic and Antarctic explorers, such as Captain Robert Bartlett, Ernest Shackleton, Richard E. Byrd, Fridtjof Nansen, Robert Falcon Scott, George W. DeLong, and Roald Amundsen.

Ingredients

Traditionally, the specific ingredients used for pemmican were usually whatever was available. The dried meat is often in the form of large game meat such as bison, deer, elk, or moose, but the use of fish such as salmon, and smaller game such as duck, is not uncommon. The meats used in contemporary pemmican also include beef. Dried fruit, such as cranberries and saskatoon berries (Cree ) sometimes are added. Blueberries, cherries, chokeberries, and currants are also used, but in some regions, these fruits are used almost exclusively in ceremonial and wedding pemmican. The additional use of sugar was noted in the journals of European fur traders. These ingredients are mixed together with rendered animal fat (tallow). 

Among the Lakota and Dakota nations, there is also a corn  (or pemmican) that does not contain dried meat. This is made from toasted cornmeal, animal fat, fruit, and sugar.

Traditional preparation

Traditionally, pemmican was prepared from the lean meat of large game such as bison, elk, deer, or moose. The meat was cut in thin slices and dried, either over a slow fire or in the hot sun until it was hard and brittle. Approximately  of meat are required to make  of dried meat suitable for pemmican. The  was then spread across a tanned animal hide pinned to the ground, where it was beaten with flails or ground between two large stones till it turned into very small pieces, almost powder-like in its consistency. The pounded meat was mixed with melted fat in an approximate 1:1 ratio by weight. Typically, the melted fat would be suet that has been rendered into tallow. In some cases, dried fruits, such as blueberries, chokecherries, cranberries, or saskatoon berries, were pounded into powder and then added to the meat-fat mixture. The resulting mixture was then packed into rawhide bags for storage where it would cool, and then harden into pemmican. 

Today, some people store their pemmican in glass jars or tin boxes. Since there is no "official" recipe for pemmican, the shelf life may vary depending on ingredients and storage conditions. At room temperature, pemmican can generally last from one to five years, but there are anecdotal stories of pemmican stored in cool cellars being safely consumed after a decade or more.

Serving 
In his notes of 1874, North-West Mounted Police Sergeant Major Sam Steele recorded three ways of serving pemmican: raw, boiled in a stew called "rubaboo", or fried, known in the West as a "rechaud":

History

As bone grease is an essential ingredient in pemmican, archaeologists consider evidence of its manufacture a strong indicator of pemmican making. There is widespread archaeological evidence (bone fragments and boiling pits) for bone grease production on the Great Plains by AD 1, but it likely developed much earlier. However, calcified bone fragments from Paleo-Indian times do not offer that clear evidence, due to lack of boiling pits and other possible usages.

It has also been suggested that pemmican may have come through the Bering Strait crossing 40–60 centuries ago. The first written account of pemmican is  considered to be Francisco Vázquez de Coronado records from 1541, of the Querechos and Teyas, traversing the region later called the Texas Panhandle, who sundried and minced bison meat and then would make a stew of it and bison fat. The first written English usage is attributed to James Isham, who in 1743 wrote that "pimmegan" was a mixture of finely pounded dried meat, fat and cranberries.

The voyageurs of the North American fur trade had no time to live off the land during the short season when the lakes and rivers were free of ice. They had to carry all of their food with them if the distance traveled was too great to be resupplied along the way. A north canoe with six men and 25 standard  packs required about four packs of food per . Montreal-based canoemen could be supplied by sea or with locally grown food. Their main food was dried peas or beans, sea biscuit, and salt pork. (Western canoemen called their Montreal-based fellows  or "pork-eaters".) In the Great Lakes, some maize and wild rice could be obtained locally. By the time trade reached the Lake Winnipeg area, the pemmican trade was developed.

Trading people of mixed ancestry and becoming known as the Métis would go southwest onto the prairie in Red River carts, slaughter bison, convert it into pemmican, and carry it north to trade from settlements they would make adjacent to North West Company posts. For these people on the edge of the prairie, the pemmican trade was as important a source of trade goods as was the beaver trade for the Indigenous peoples farther north. This trade was a major factor in the emergence of the new and distinct Métis society. Packs of pemmican would be shipped north and stored at the major fur posts: Fort Alexander, Cumberland House, Île-à-la-Crosse, Fort Garry, Norway House, and Edmonton House. 

So important was pemmican that, in 1814, governor Miles Macdonell started the Pemmican War with the Métis when he passed the short-lived Pemmican Proclamation, which forbade the export of pemmican from the Red River Colony. 

Alexander Mackenzie relied on pemmican on his 1793 expedition from the Canadas to the Pacific.

North Pole explorer Robert Peary used pemmican on all three of his expeditions, from 1886 to 1909, for both his men and his dogs. In his 1917 book, Secrets of Polar Travel, he devoted several pages to the food, stating, "Too much cannot be said of the importance of pemmican to a polar expedition. It is an absolute . Without it a sledge-party cannot compact its supplies within a limit of weight to make a serious polar journey successful."

British polar expeditions fed a type of pemmican to their dogs as "sledging rations". Called "Bovril pemmican" or simply "dog pemmican", it was a beef product consisting, by volume, of  protein and  fat (i.e., a 2:1 ratio of protein to fat), without carbohydrate. It was later ascertained that although the dogs survived on it, this was not a nutritious and healthy diet for them, being too high in protein. Members of Ernest Shackleton's 1914–1916 expedition to the Antarctic resorted to eating dog pemmican when they were stranded on ice during the antarctic summer.

The pemmican would keep in perfect condition for decades. It was considered much superior to biltong, a form of cured game meats commonly used in Africa. This iron ration was prepared in two small tins (soldered together) that were fastened inside the belts of the soldiers. It was the last ration used and it was used only as a last resort—when ordered by the commanding officer. A man could march on this for 36 hours before he began to drop from hunger.

While serving as chief of scouts for the British Army in South Africa, American adventurer Frederick Russell Burnham required pemmican to be carried by every scout.

Pemmican, likely condensed meat bars, was used as a ration for French troops fighting in Morocco in the 1920s.

A 1945 scientific study of pemmican criticized using it exclusively as a survival food because of the low levels of certain vitamins.

A study was later done by the U.S. military in January 1969, entitled Arctic Survival Rations, III. The Evaluation of Pemmican Under Winter Field Conditions. The study found that during a cycle of two starvation periods the subjects could stave off starvation for the first cycle of testing with only 1000 calories worth of pemmican.

Contemporary uses 
Today, people in many indigenous communities across North America continue to make pemmican for personal, community, and ceremonial consumption. Some contemporary pemmican recipes incorporate ingredients that have been introduced to the Americas in the past 500 years, including beef. There are also indigenous-owned companies, such as Tanka Bar, based on Pine Ridge Indian Reservation in South Dakota, that produce pemmican or foods based on traditional pemmican recipes, for commercial distribution.

See also

 , also called "butter mochi", a similarly nutritious substance used by Matagi hunters in northern Japan
 Alaskan ice cream
 Food drying
 Forcemeat
 Jerky
 Viande fumée
 Mincemeat 
 Nutraloaf
 Smoked fish
 Smoked meat
 Tolkusha
 Pastirma

Notes

References

External links

 Métis Nation in the pemmican trade
 Experiments in traditional pemmican preparation
  How to make pemmican
 How to Make a 5,000-Year-Old Energy Bar
 Arctic Survival Rations, III. The Evaluation of Pemmican Under Winter Field Conditions

Cree language
Native American cuisine
Dried meat
Indigenous cuisine in Canada
Traditional meat processing
Métis culture
Fur trade
Indigenous culture of the Great Plains
Historical foods in American cuisine